Quercus hypoxantha is a species of oak. It has been found only in northeastern Mexico, in the States of Tamaulipas, Coahuila, and Nuevo León.

References

External links
photo of herbarium specimen collected in Nuevo León in 1969

hypoxantha
Endemic oaks of Mexico
Flora of the Sierra Madre Oriental
Plants described in 1924
Data deficient plants
Taxonomy articles created by Polbot
Taxa named by William Trelease